Gunabhadra (394–468) was a monk and translator of Mahayana Buddhism from Magadha, Central India. His biography is contained in the work of a Chinese monk called Sengyou entitled Chu sanzang ji ji.

Life
Gunabhadra was said to have originally been born into a Brahman family but studied the Miśrakābhidharmahṛdaya under a Mahayana master which led to his conversion to Buddhism.

He traveled to China by sea with Gunavarma in 435 after first visiting Sri Lanka. They were both treated as honored guests by Emperor Wen of Liu Song, the ruler of South China at the time. In China, he translated one of the key Mahayana sutras, the Laṅkāvatāra Sūtra, from Sanskrit to Chinese, and Vekhanasa Sutra , which forms "a volume from the Issaikyō (a Buddhist corpus), commonly known as Jingo-ji kyō," as it was handed down at the Jingo-ji temple. 
Before translating the Laṅkāvatāra Sūtra, he translated another important sutra, the Saṃyuktāgama into Chinese. He continued to be active in other translations and preaching. His Chinese biography also details that he mastered the Tripiṭaka.

Translations 
CBETA lists the following sutra translations as Gunabhadra's:

 Lalitavistara Sūtra, 
 Śuka Sūtra, 
 Vekhanassa Sūtra, 
 Saṃyuktāgama, 
 Aṅgulimālīka Sūtra, 
 The Birth of Four People in the World Sūtra, 
 Eleven Contemplations of Mindfulness of the Tathāgata Sūtra
 Mahāmati Sūtra,
 Sūtra on Past and Present causes and Effects
 Mahābherīhāraka Sūtra
 The Sūtra of the Bodhisattva's Practice of Skilful Means and Manifestation by Supernormal Powers amidst Sense Ranges
 The Śrīmāla Sūtra
 The Attainment of Birth in the Pure Land Dhāraṇī which Severs all Karmic Obstructions
 The Mahāvaipulya Anakṣarakaraṇḍaka Sūtra
 Mahākaśyapa Gives to his Mother Sautra
 The Past Life of the Boy Candra Sūtra
 The Jotiṣka Sūtra
 The Mahallikā Paripṛcchā Sūtra
 The Laṅkāvatara Sūtra
 The Saṃdhinirmocana Sūtra
 A separate translation of Chapter 9 of the Saṃdhinirmocana
 The retribution of Advantageous Rewards Sūtra
 The Punishments and Rewards of Turning the Wheel of the Five Paths Sūtra
 The Twelve Chapter Birth and Death Sūtra
 The Four Chapter Dharma Study Sūtra
 The Twelve Dhūta Practice Sūtra
 The Anantamukhasādhakadhāraṇī Sūtra
 The Abhidharmaprakaraṇapāda Śāstra
 The Piṇḍolabharadhvaja Teaches the Dharma to the King of Udayana Sūtra

References

External links
Dunhuang Art - Introduction
Zen Readings
Saṃyuktāgama

394 births
468 deaths
4th-century Buddhist monks
5th-century Buddhist monks
Indian Buddhist monks
Buddhist translators
Indian Buddhist missionaries